Jeroen Lombe Lumu (born 27 May 1995) is a Dutch footballer who plays as a winger for Greek club Poros.

Career

Willem II
Born in Breda to a DR Congolese father and a Javanese-Surinamese mother, Lumu began his football career at Willem II. He made his debut on 16 January 2012, when he was just 16 years old, coming on as a second-half substitute in a 3–1 away loss against MVV Maastricht in the Eerste Divisie.

Lumu made his Eredivisie debut on 15 September 2012, coming on as a 71st-minute substitute against Twente. His goal thirteen minutes later earned him the distinction within the club while in the Eredivisie of being the youngest goal scorer.

Ludogorets Razgrad
On 8 January 2014, Ludogorets Razgrad announced they had reached an agreement to sign Lumu from Willem II for an undisclosed fee, rumoured to be a €150,000. On 9 January, he signed a long-term contract. Lumu scored on his debut in a friendly game against Pirin Blagoevgrad on 16 January, netting the fourth in a 5–1 win. He also netted an important last-minute goal on 30 April against CSKA Sofia to help his team to a 1–0 home win, almost clinching a third successive A PFG title for Ludogorets.

SC Heerenveen
On 21 August 2014, it was announced that Lumu had signed a one-year deal with Eredivisie side SC Heerenveen. Lumu made his debut for Heerenveen in the home match against Excelsior on 23 August 2014, coming on as a 70th-minute substitute for Norwegian midfielder Morten Thorsby.

Delhi Dynamos
On 13 September 2017, it was announced that Indian Super League (ISL) side Delhi Dynamos have completed the signing of Jeroen Lumu from Turkish side Samsunspor. The young winger became the seventh foreign signing of the Delhi-based club.

FC Arouca
On 24 January 2019, Lumu joined the Portuguese club F.C. Arouca.

Career statistics

Honours

Club
Ludogorets Razgrad	
 Bulgarian A Group: 2013–14
 Bulgarian Cup: 2013–14
 Bulgarian Supercup: 2014

International
Netherlands
 UEFA European Under-17 Football Championship: 2012

References

External links
 
 Voetbal International profile

1995 births
Living people
Footballers from Breda
Dutch people of Democratic Republic of the Congo descent
Dutch sportspeople of Surinamese descent
Surinamese people of Javanese descent
Dutch footballers
Dutch expatriate footballers
Netherlands youth international footballers
Association football forwards
Willem II (football club) players
SC Heerenveen players
FC Dordrecht players
PFC Ludogorets Razgrad players
SKN St. Pölten players
Samsunspor footballers
Odisha FC players
FC Petrolul Ploiești players
F.C. Arouca players
FC Saburtalo Tbilisi players
Floriana F.C. players
Omonia Aradippou players
Eredivisie players
Eerste Divisie players
First Professional Football League (Bulgaria) players
Austrian Football Bundesliga players
Austrian Regionalliga players
TFF First League players
Indian Super League players
Liga II players
Liga Portugal 2 players
Erovnuli Liga players
Maltese Premier League players
Dutch expatriate sportspeople in Bulgaria
Expatriate footballers in Bulgaria
Dutch expatriate sportspeople in Austria
Expatriate footballers in Austria
Dutch expatriate sportspeople in Turkey
Expatriate footballers in Turkey
Dutch expatriate sportspeople in India
Expatriate footballers in India
Dutch expatriate sportspeople in Romania
Expatriate footballers in Romania
Dutch expatriate sportspeople in Portugal
Expatriate footballers in Portugal
Dutch expatriate sportspeople in Georgia (country)
Expatriate footballers in Georgia (country)
Dutch expatriate sportspeople in Malta
Expatriate footballers in Malta
Dutch expatriate sportspeople in South Africa
Expatriate soccer players in South Africa
Dutch expatriate sportspeople in Cyprus
Expatriate footballers in Cyprus
Marumo Gallants F.C. players